Picasso's Face  is a 2000 comedy film written, directed and starred by Massimo Ceccherini.

Plot
Massimo Ceccherini is looking for a plot for his new movie: the suggestions of the people around him are all the same and they indicate "less vulgarity" and "more gags". In the end, he just settles for a long series of homages, ranging from the Rocky film series to Jaws, redone in a picaresque way.

Cast
 Massimo Ceccherini as himself
 Alessandro Paci as  Himself
 Marco Giallini as  Producer
 Bianca Guaccero as  Samantha
 Pietro Fornaciari as  Fernando Capecchi
 Chiara Conti as  Stefania Nobili
 Yuliya Mayarchuk as  Ukraine Girl
 Giovanni Veronesi as  Priest
 Vincenzo Salemme as  Himself
 Andrea Balestri as  Pinocchio / Himself
 Christian Vieri as  Ivan Drago

References

External links
 

Italian comedy films
2000 comedy films
2000 films